The Tripp family of Dordrecht were Dutch merchants who traded extensively in the Middle East, Russia and Scandinavia.

References

Dutch merchants